Claude Raymond Welch (March 10, 1922 in Genoa City, Wisconsin – November 6, 2009 in Freeport, Illinois) was a historical theologian specializing in Karl Barth and nineteenth-century theology. He served as President (1971-1982) and academic dean (1971-1987) of the Graduate Theological Union in California.

Publications
Protestant Thought in the Nineteenth Century, 2 vols. (Yale, 1972, 1985)
"Nineteenth Century: An Overview," in Oxford Companion to Christian Thought (Oxford, 2000)
(with John Dillenberger) Protestant Christianity, Interpreted Through Its Development, 2nd edition (Macmillan, 1988)
The Reality of the Church (Scribners, 1958)
Graduate Education in Religion: A Critical Appraisal (Montana, 1971)
In This Name: The Doctrine of the Trinity in Contemporary Theology (Scribners, 1952)

External links
The Boom in Religion Studies
 Fred Sanders: Claude Welch, 1922–2009
 GTU: In Memoriam: Claude Welch

1922 births
2009 deaths
Presidents of the American Academy of Religion
University of Pennsylvania faculty